Fikret Arıcan (17 July 1912 – 1994) was a footballer and chairman of Turkish sports club Fenerbahçe SK between 1984–86. He was regarded as one of the best Turkish football players of the pre-war era.

He was born in Istanbul, Turkey. He started his football career with Fenerbahçe when he was 12. He also managed the football team twice between 1945–47 and in 1955. Fikret Arıcan played eight times for the Turkish national team between 1931–37 and scored two goals. He was also part of Turkey's squad at the 1936 Summer Olympics.

References

External links
 
 

1912 births
1994 deaths
Footballers from Istanbul
Turkish footballers
Fenerbahçe S.K. footballers
Olympic footballers of Turkey
Footballers at the 1936 Summer Olympics
Fenerbahçe S.K. presidents
Fenerbahçe football managers
Turkey international footballers
Association football forwards
Turkish football managers